West-Park Presbyterian Church is a Romanesque Revival Presbyterian church located on the corner of Amsterdam Avenue at 86th Street on the Upper West Side of Manhattan in New York City. It consists of a main sanctuary and chapel.

Congregation history

The congregation was founded in 1852 as the 84th Street Presbyterian Church, building its first chapel of timber in 1854 on 84th Street and West End Avenue, to designs by one of the city’s most prominent architects, Prague-born Leopold Eidlitz. The church changed its name to Park Presbyterian Church in 1887. The name became West-Park Presbyterian when the midtown West Presbyterian Church (founded 1829) merged with Park Presbyterian in 1911.

Present church building
The small congregation moved north in uptown Manhattan a number of times. Upon moving to the Upper West Side, one wealthy new pastor (from 1879), Anson Phelps Atterbury (1855–1931), proposed a grand church in the hopes that the congregation would expand with the expected increases to the neighborhood that the new IRT lines along Broadway would bring. That pastor commissioned Leopold Eidlitz to build a diminutive midblock brick Romanesque Revival chapel in 1884, a style Eidlitz described as "muscular" Romanesque and considered appropriate to an evangelical Protestant church. After a further $100,000 was raised, the main sanctuary was built in 1889-90 on the abutting corner site, to designs by Henry Franklin Kilburn in intricately carved brown and red sandstone in a stylistic continuation of Eidlitz's Romanesque chapel but re-cladding that brick chapel in sandstone and adding an offset diminutive tower. The corner features a giant ribbed bell-domed belltower, which dominates the neighborhood and if not for the competing heights of apartment towers “would be one of the West Side’s loveliest landmarks,” according to the AIA Guide to NYC.

In 2016, the church hosted SONNET REMIX 2, a celebration of Shakespeare's Sonnets featuring artists presenting the sonnets including Stairwell Theater, Carman Moore, Jason Trachtenburg, Joel Gold, Ariana Karp, Matt and Rafferty of Evolfo.

Preservation

In the 1980s, the church was re-pointed with cement, which has resulted in substantial erosion of the soft sandstone. Around the same time, the church installed a new elevator for handicap accessibility in the parish house (the original chapel).

In the early 2000s, the congregation hired a developer to address their financial situation, diminished attendance, and role in society. Their findings proposed the replacement of the complex with an eighteen- to twenty-three-story residential tower and a smaller new corner glass church, designed by the architectural firm of Franke, Gottsegen & Cox.  The design featured a “prow-shaped base of stone,” with a sweeping 125-foot glass carillon tower providing “a luminous well of light.” The current social outreach and education facilities would be doubled and the modern design, the architects asserted, would create a sense of refuge and “communitarian communality.” The architects described the design: "...the crisscrossing of the structure, like a canopy of trees, but you won’t be able to see the top, which we think is an expression of sacredness,” adding, “the sanctuary is very flexible and interfaith use is possible so that space can be shared with other denominations.”

In response, activists organized the “Friends of West-Park” to protest the development while concurrently working toward a viable alternative plan as well as funds. The group principally feared the loss of air and light with the new tower. The co-chairman of Friends of West-Park stated that the group was not interested “in telling the church that it had to maintain itself for the community good without the community taking some role [but instead they] formed a development company capable of doing what [they] say and working on a partnership with the church.” The "Friends" suggested selling Eidlitz's chapel for redevelopment to a non-profit, probably a school, to offset the cost of renovation, with neighboring buildings preparing to lease air rights. Most of the external walls would be preserved, restoring the sandstone and stained glass but not the original roof shape nor the forty-foot interior, which would be gutted. Its sanctuary would be raised to gallery level and fitted with movable seating; since divided windows already exist, the alteration would not be externally evident, leaving the commercially ideal ground floor for other uses, possibly social outreach or educational. One architect responsible for the sympathetic second plan explained that “successful rehabilitation allows the character and original intent of the first architect to come through. So the question is, If not every square inch is sacred turf, how much modification can the structure bear without losing what makes it special?” Rev. Brashear of West-Park was quoted as receptive to the community input but stated that the congregation, trustees, and various levels of the Presbytery are still deciding the unprotected church’s fate.

The congregation moved to share space in 2008 with the neighboring Renaissance Revival-styled, Saints Paul and Andrew United Methodist Church (1897), protected as a city landmark and itself a product of a 1937 denominational merger.

The church was finally declared a landmark by the New York City Landmarks Preservation Commission on January 12, 2010.

In April 2022, it was announced that the West-Park Presbyterian congregation would appeal their landmark designation under an existing hardship provision, citing their inability to provide or source funds for repairs. The building is currently in a very poor condition, and has been surrounded by a sidewalk shed to shield pedestrians from potential falling masonry since 2001. The congregation initially estimated the cost of repairs at $30 to $50 million, however this figure was disputed by the neighborhood's Councilmember Gale Brewer. An independent estimate is forthcoming. A successful appeal would allow for the sale of the church site to Alchemy Properties, who will replace the existing structure with a residential building that incorporates worship space for the congregation.

See also
 National Register of Historic Places listings in Manhattan from 59th to 110th Streets
 List of New York City Designated Landmarks in Manhattan from 59th to 110th Streets

References

19th-century Presbyterian church buildings in the United States
Churches completed in 1884
Churches completed in 1890
Churches in Manhattan
Leopold Eidlitz church buildings
New York City Designated Landmarks in Manhattan
Presbyterian churches in New York City
Romanesque Revival church buildings in New York City
Rundbogenstil churches
Upper West Side